Montano may refer to:

People
 Montano, an Italian surname, and anglicizatino of accented surnames
 Montaño, a Spanish surname
 Montano d'Arezzo (13th/14th c.) Italian painter

Places
 Montaño station, Commuter Rail station in Albuquerque, New Mexico, USA

Other uses
 Montano orthohantavirus (MTNV; Montano virus), a hantavirus

See also

 
 
 Montana (disambiguation)